Thomas Constantine Laris (born June 26, 1940, in New York City, New York) is an American long-distance runner who competed in the 10,000 meters at the 1968 Summer Olympics.  He finished in 16th place.   He had previously won a bronze medal in the same event at the 1967 Pan American Games.  Laris's personal record (pr) in the mile was 4:06 in 1972.

Laris also competed in Masters Track and Field.

References

1940 births
Living people
Track and field athletes from New York City
American male long-distance runners
American people of Greek descent
Olympic track and field athletes of the United States
Athletes (track and field) at the 1968 Summer Olympics
Pan American Games medalists in athletics (track and field)
Pan American Games bronze medalists for the United States
Athletes (track and field) at the 1967 Pan American Games
Medalists at the 1967 Pan American Games